The O and P class was a class of destroyers of the British Royal Navy. Ordered in 1939, they were the first ships in the War Emergency Programme, also known as the 1st and 2nd Emergency Flotilla, respectively. They served as convoy escorts in World War II, and some were subsequently converted to fast second-rate anti-submarine frigates in the 1950s.

Design
The O and P class were based on the hull and machinery of the preceding J class, but with more sheer forward to counter the poor riding qualities of the Js. These ships used the Fuze Keeping Clock HA Fire Control Computer.

O class
The O-class ships were built in two groups of four. The first group had 4.7 inch guns. They were in low-angle mounts which could elevate to only 40 degrees, and were additionally fitted with a 4 inch anti-aircraft gun in place of one set of torpedo tubes. The second group had  guns in high-angle mounts and were fitted to act as minelayers; they could be recognized by the flat "beaver tail" stern over which the mines were dropped. 

When carrying mines they had to land Y gun, their torpedo tubes and depth charges. The designed anti-aircraft armament was one quadruple QF 2-pounder "pom pom" and a pair of quadruple 0.5-inch Vickers A/A machine guns. The latter proved to be outdated, and were replaced by 20 mm Oerlikon guns as they became available, with a total of six single mounts eventually being carried.

P class
The P class were repeats of the O class, armed entirely with 4 inch guns, in high-angle mounts fitted with a new tall design of shield which did not require the ships to lose a set of torpedo tubes to take on further AA guns.

Ships

O class
All ships survived the war. Five of them were involved in the Battle of the Barents Sea, Onslow being badly damaged. After the battle, the ships were refitted with tall lattice masts instead of the normal mast.

All of the O-class ships with 4-inch armament were fitted for minelaying.

P class
They served mainly in the Mediterranean, where four ships were lost.

See also
Type 16 frigate: postwar conversion of some O and P class vessels into second-rate fast anti-submarine frigates.

Notes

References
 Destroyers of the Royal Navy, 1893–1981, Maurice Cocker, Ian Allan,

External links

Destroyer classes
 
Ship classes of the Royal Navy